The DRG Class E94 is an electric heavy freight locomotive built for Deutsche Reichsbahn from 1940, with the bulk of deliveries taking place in that year. It was a major evolution of the DRG Class E 93. Railway aficionados still call the type "Grünes Krokodil" (Green Crocodile) because of the resemblance to the Swiss locomotive nicknamed "Crocodile".

Production
After World War II, new units were ordered and delivered as late as 1957.

Transfers to ÖBB
After the war, 44 units were placed under the authority of the Austrian Federal Railways (ÖBB). In 1952, the ÖBB ordered three complementary locos. In 1954, they were classified as class 1020.

Electric locomotives of Germany
15 kV AC locomotives
E94
Co′Co′ locomotives
AEG locomotives
Brown, Boveri & Cie locomotives
Railway locomotives introduced in 1940
Standard gauge locomotives of Germany

Co′Co′ electric locomotives of Europe